Semi Belkahia (born 22 December 1998) is a German professional footballer who plays as a centre-back for 1860 Munich.

Career
Belkahia made his professional debut for 1860 Munich on 8 April 2019, coming on as a substitute in the 89th minute for Dennis Dressel in the 1–0 away loss against Sonnenhof Großaspach.

Personal life
Belkahia was born in Munich, Bavaria and is of Tunisian descent.

References

External links
 
 
 

1998 births
Living people
German people of Tunisian descent
Footballers from Munich
German footballers
Association football central defenders
VfR Garching players
TSV 1860 Munich II players
TSV 1860 Munich players
3. Liga players
Regionalliga players